Hang Sai is a Macanese professional football club which currently competes in the Liga de Elite.

History
In 2017, Hang Sai won the 2ª Divisão de Macau title and were promoted to the top flight for the first time.

Current squad

See also
Ka I 21–18 Hang Sai

References 

Football clubs in Macau